Bailey is a city in Fannin County, in the U.S. state of Texas. The population was 289 at the 2010 census, up from 213 at the 2000 census.

History
The town began in the late 1850s, when farmers moved into the area to take advantage of the rich soil. Cotton and corn became the principal crops. Two prominent residents competed to have the town named after themselves: Doctors Josiah S. Bailey and A. J. Ray owned land that was to become the townsite. The dispute ended in 1885, when the St. Louis Southwestern Railway used the land donated by Bailey for its right-of-way.

Geography

Bailey is located in southern Fannin County at  (33.434279, –96.165364). Texas State Highway 11 passes through the city, leading northwest  to Whitewright and southeast  to Wolfe City. Texas State Highway 78 crosses Highway 11 south of the center of Bailey, leading north  to Bonham, the Fannin County seat, and southwest  to Leonard.

Demographics

As of the census of 2000, there were 213 people, 80 households, and 60 families residing in the city. The population density was 532.2 people per square mile (205.6/km2). There were 98 housing units at an average density of 244.9 per square mile (94.6/km2). The racial makeup of the city was 90.61% White, 0.94% Native American, 0.47% Asian, 4.69% from other races, and 3.29% from two or more races. Hispanic or Latino of any race were 10.80% of the population.

There were 80 households, out of which 40.0% had children under the age of 18 living with them, 57.5% were married couples living together, 8.8% had a female householder with no husband present, and 25.0% were non-families. 23.8% of all households were made up of individuals, and 8.8% had someone living alone who was 65 years of age or older. The average household size was 2.66 and the average family size was 3.15.

In the city, the population was spread out, with 29.1% under the age of 18, 12.2% from 18 to 24, 25.8% from 25 to 44, 23.5% from 45 to 64, and 9.4% who were 65 years of age or older. The median age was 33 years. For every 100 females, there were 102.9 males. For every 100 females age 18 and over, there were 96.1 males.

The median income for a household in the city was $42,292, and the median income for a family was $42,500. Males had a median income of $40,417 versus $25,417 for females. The per capita income for the city was $26,677. About 19.7% of families and 21.4% of the population were below the poverty line, including 36.0% of those under the age of eighteen and 13.3% of those 65 or over.

Education
The City of Bailey is served by the Bonham Independent School District.

Notable people
Ruby Allmond, singer/songwriter
Jim Battle, Major League Baseball player
Roy Leslie, Major League Baseball player

Media 
Bailey is mentioned in Tom Ford's Nocturnal Animals (2016).

References

Cities in Texas
Cities in Fannin County, Texas